Hambleton is a village and civil parish in the English county of Lancashire. It is situated on a coastal plain called the Fylde and in an area east of the River Wyre known locally as Over Wyre. In the 2001 United Kingdom census, the parish had a population of 2,678, increasing to 2,744 at the 2011 census.

Hambleton is part of the Borough of Wyre and is in the parliamentary constituency of Wyre and Preston North.

History
Hambleton was recorded as Hameltune in the Domesday Book of 1086 and as Hamelton in the 12th century. By the 16th century, the spelling was Hambleton.

At the time of the Norman conquest of England in 1066, Hambleton was a small township in the ancient hundred of Amounderness, in the possession of King Harold II's brother Earl Tostig. The area of the township was assessed as two carucates or ploughlands. A chapel of ease had been built in the village by the 16th century, dedicated to the Blessed Virgin Mary. The chapel was consecrated in 1567.

Governance

Hambleton is governed locally by a parish council. The civil parish, along with Stalmine-with-Staynall, forms the ward of Hambleton and Stalmine-with-Staynall. The population of this ward at the 2011 Census was 4,230. The ward has two elected councillors. Hambleton was formerly part of the rural district of Garstang. In 1974, the district merged with those of Fleetwood, Thornton-Cleveleys, Poulton-le-Fylde and Preesall to form Wyre Borough Council.

The village is represented in the House of Commons of the Parliament of the United Kingdom as part of Wyre and Preston North. It elects one MP by the first past the post system of election. Since its creation for the 2010 general election, Wyre and Preston North has been represented at Parliament by Conservative MP Ben Wallace. Prior to the 2010 general election, Hambleton was part of the constituency of Lancaster and Wyre. Prior to Brexit in 2020, the village was part of the North West England constituency of the European Parliament.

Demography
At the 2001 UK census, the civil parish of Hambleton had a population of 2,678. The 2001 population density for the ward of Hambleton and Stalmine-with-Staynall was 2.61 per hectare, with a 100 to 93.0 female-to-male ratio. The proportion of residents who classified themselves as White was 99.5%, a figure higher than those for Wyre (98.9%), the North West (94.4%) and England (90.9%).

Hambleton and Stalmine-with-Staynall's 1,796 households included 27.7% one-person households, 41.5% married couples living together (with or without children), 5.9% co-habiting couples, and 5.5% single parents with their children.

Population change

Landmarks and community
Hambleton has four drinking establishments: two pubs, a club and a bar — the Shard Riverside Hotel, the Shovels Inn, the Hambleton Sports & Social Club and the Puddled Duck. Hambleton Hall is an 18th-century house that has been designated a Grade II listed building by English Heritage.

Hambleton has a number of shops which include (but not limited to) an off-license, butchers, cheese shop, hairdressers and a petrol station which is also a Spar shop.

Due to Hambleton being considered a rural settlement, there is a small number of full time jobs available in the village. The majority of employed residents commute to Preston , Fleetwood and Blackpool which has caused a rise in traffic congestion within and around the village in recent years.

Religion and education
Hambleton's Anglican parish church, dedicated to the Blessed Virgin Mary, was rebuilt in 1749. It forms part of the benefice of The Waterside Parishes of Hambleton, Out Rawcliffe and Preesall, and is in the Diocese of Blackburn. The village had a Roman Catholic church, dedicated to Francis of Assisi, which was in the Diocese of Lancaster. It was built in 1979 as a chapel of ease to St Mary's in Great Eccleston, but has since been demolished. Hambleton also has a United Reformed church.
 
Hambleton has one primary school.

Transport
The railway came to the Fylde in the first half of the 19th century; the Preston and Wyre Railway line was completed in 1840. The nearest railway station to Hambleton is Poulton-le-Fylde, which connects to major national train routes at Preston railway station.
Hambleton lies on the A588 road between Poulton and Lancaster.

Hambleton's nearest international airports are Liverpool John Lennon Airport and Manchester Airport.

The 2C bus service that is run by Blackpool Transport serves the village. Buses to Knott End-on-Sea and Blackpool run every thirty minutes.

Notable people
Tom Bradshaw, former professional footballer
Phil Clarkson, former professional footballer
Terry Pashley, former professional footballer
Derek Spence, former professional footballer who owned the village off-licence during the 1990s
Carl Myerscough, shot put and discus thrower

See also

Listed buildings in Hambleton, Lancashire
Wardleys Pub

References
Footnotes

Bibliography

Further reading

External links

 
Villages in Lancashire
Civil parishes in Lancashire
Geography of the Borough of Wyre
The Fylde